Clara Koppenburg (born 3 August 1995) is a German professional racing cyclist, who rides for UCI Women's Continental Team .

Major results

2017
 2nd Crescent Vårgårda TTT
 3rd  Team time trial, UCI Road World Championships
 4th Time trial, UEC European Under-23 Road Championships
 8th Overall Gracia–Orlová
1st Young rider classification
2018
 3rd Crescent Vårgårda TTT
 3rd Team time trial, Ladies Tour of Norway
 4th Ljubljana–Domžale–Ljubljana TT
 9th Overall Emakumeen Euskal Bira
2019
 1st  Overall Setmana Ciclista Valenciana
1st Stage 3
 2nd Overall Tour Cycliste Féminin International de l'Ardèche
 4th Overall Tour of California
 5th Overall Giro della Toscana Int. Femminile – Memorial Michela Fanini
 7th Overall Tour de Bretagne Féminin
 8th Time trial, European Games
2020
 2nd Overall Setmana Ciclista Valenciana
 4th Durango-Durango Emakumeen Saria
 6th Emakumeen Nafarroako Klasikoa
2021
 4th Overall Vuelta a Burgos Feminas
2022
 2nd Mont Ventoux Dénivelé Challenge

See also
 List of 2015 UCI Women's Teams and riders

References

External links
 
 

1995 births
Living people
German female cyclists
People from Lörrach
Sportspeople from Freiburg (region)
European Games competitors for Germany
Cyclists at the 2019 European Games
Cyclists from Baden-Württemberg
20th-century German women
21st-century German women